Sarotti is a German chocolate brand owned by Stollwerck GmbH since 1998.

History

Berlin

In 1868 Hugo Hoffmann opened a company to produce sweets. The location of this shop was in Mohrenstraße 10 in Berlin. The industrial chocolate production took place on Mehringdamm No. 57 (then Belle-Alliance-Str. 81) since 1881, extended by Mehringdamm No. 55 in 1903 (then Belle-Alliance-Str. 82) and Mehringdamm No. 53 in 1906 (then Belle-Alliance-Str. 83). In 1913 the factory moved into a new building on Teilestraße 13–15 in Tempelhof, now part of Berlin.

Hattersheim

Another industrial chocolate production of Sarotti took place in Hattersheim in Hesse. With the change of the majority stockholding the factory merged to Nestlé. The factory in Hattersheim was in the 1960s one of the biggest companies in Hattersheim and Main-Taunus district with a workforce up to 2,000 workers. The factory was closed down in 1994 and has been officially designated a historic site by Hesse.

The Sarotti-Moor (Mohr)

The Sarotti-Moor (Mohr) was created in 1918 for the 50 year anniversary of the company. In 1929 Nestlé became the majority stockholder in the company. This traditional German brand is only known in its home market. In 1998 Nestlé sold Sarotti to Stollwerck Chocolates, which itself became part of the Belgian Sweet Products/Baronie in 2011. In an attempt to stave off accusations of racism, the tray-carrying blackamoor had been changed into a "mage" of golden skin colour in 2004.

References

External links
  Sarotti.de
  Stollwerck.de
 

Brand name chocolate
German brands
German confectionery